Þvílíkt Og Annað Eins is the 1981 studio album of Mezzoforte on Steinar. It is their third album, released only in Iceland only on LP. Along with their first record, Mezzoforte (1979), these two weren't remastered in 1996 with the rest of their early discography, or ever released internationally or on CD, however 7 of the 9 tracks from Þvílíkt Og Annað Eins were released internationally in 1983 on the compilation album Catching Up with Mezzoforte which also included 7 songs from their second album, Í Hakanum/Octopus and peaked at #95 on the UK Album Chart. Even though the third album’s title track was translated as Surprise, the album is sometimes referred to in English as Dreamland, which is the only song from the album released on a single, thus it can’t be confused with their fourth album, titled Surprise Surprise which was an international success, peaking at #23 on the UK Album Chart. The song Dreamland was released in 1982 on a double A-side single with second album’s Shooting Star.

Cover 
Mezzoforte’s fourth album was originally released in Iceland as 4, but the record company decided to use the cover of Þvílíkt Og Annað Eins for the international release, titled Surprise Surprise.

Track listing

Personnel 
Mezzoforte:
 Friðrik Karlsson Guitar
 Eyþór Gunnarsson Keyboard
 Björn Thorarensen Keyboard
 Jóhann Ásmundsson Bass
 Gunnlaugur Briem Drums

Additional musicians:
 Louis Jardim Percussion
 Ron Aspery Alto and Tenor Saxophone (3, 5)

Technical:
 Simon Heyworth: Producer, Recording Engineer
 Ernst J. Backman: Cover Artwork

References 

1981 albums
Mezzoforte (band) albums